Tsvetana Sotirova (born 22 December 1939) is a Bulgarian former cross-country skier. She competed in three events at the 1968 Winter Olympics.

References

External links
 

1939 births
Living people
Bulgarian female cross-country skiers
Olympic cross-country skiers of Bulgaria
Cross-country skiers at the 1968 Winter Olympics
People from Gotse Delchev
Sportspeople from Blagoevgrad Province